Joyce Menges is a retired American actress. She starred in Robert Butler's Now You See Him, Now You Don't as well as in the TV show To Rome With Love starring John Forsythe. Joyce's son is Jimmy Tamborello, the composer for the electronic indie pop band The Postal Service.

Filmography

External links

1948 births
Living people
Actresses from Los Angeles
American film actresses
20th-century American actresses
People from Sherman Oaks, Los Angeles
21st-century American women